Ademorin Aliu Kuye (born 11 February 1963 in Lagos), is a Nigerian legal practitioner and politician who is a Honorable Member of the Nigerian Federal House of Representatives, representing Shomolu Federal Constituency since 2015. A member of All Progressive Congress, he previously served at different times, as the Chairman and Executive Secretary of Shomolu Local Government since 2013, and later, the honorable Commissioner for Local Government and Chieftaincy Affairs, Lagos state. He was also the Senior Special Adviser to the Honorable Minister of Labour on industrial dispute and arbitration where he heads the Federal Government Arbitration panel that mediates disputes between the Federal Government and labor unions, the post he held till 2019.

Background 
Ademorin Aliu Kuye was born on 11 February 1963 to Barrister A. Kuye and Alhaja Abike Kuye, popularly known as Iya Alamala, around Somolu, Apata in Lagos, Nigeria of the golden 70’s and 80’s.

Barrister Ademorin Aliu Kuye is a Politician, Legal Practitioner and arbitrator. He graduated with Bachelor of Law Degree from University of Ife (now Obafemi Awolowo University) and was called to Bar in 1989. After several years of working experience with some leading chambers and senior lawyers, he went into full practice before venturing into politics. He was at different times, the Chairman and the Executive Secretary of Shomolu Local Government and later, the Hon. Commissioner for Local Government and Chieftaincy Affairs, Lagos State.

He is happily married and blessed with five children. Until now, a keen sport lover who never misses his morning exercises. A lively personality whose best relaxation spot is not at a joint or a club, neither untoward any unprofessional organization; but in the church or fellowship with brethren where he believes, in the presence of God there is fullness of joy. When he is not officially engaged, he is at home with his family watching football or listening to news.

Education 
Ademorin Kuye was among the first in Somolu to have a GCE A’Levels, thereafter, he proceeded to the Obafemi Awolowo University formerly known as University of Ife in 1984 where he obtained his Bachelors’ degree in Law, LLB (Hons). He had his primary education at the Christ Church Cathedral Primary School, Olowogbowo, Lagos and proceeded to Ilupeju College for his Secondary education in 1976. In September 1980, he moved from Ilupeju College to Oriwu College in Ikorodu to get his O’Levels Certificate. He attended Ibadan Grammar School, Molete for the GCE A’Levels.

Political life 
Honorable Kuye is presently an Honourable Member, Federal House of Representatives, representing Shomolu Federal Constituency 1 and serving in various committee of the green house. He is also inaugurated chairman, Committee on Review of Abandoned Federal Government Infrastructures throughout Nigeria. In 2019 general election in Nigeria, Kuye defeated his major PDP opponent and the other 8 candidates registered with the Independent National Electoral Commission to contest in the election. APC candidate Ademorin Kuye won the election, defeating PDP Oluwaseyi Olowu and 8 other party candidates. Kuye received 52.66% of the votes, while Olowu received 46.21%.

Religious view on politics 
As a Gospel crusader, Kuye in his encounter with Editor, Gracious Akintayo, he bares his mind on Christian politics and governance, and other credible issues, Kuye hope that attitude of Christians towards politics should be readdressed. In his own opinion, he said, "it is time Christians should sit on the fence, observing with the aim of complaining, criticizing and condemning; to exercise their right as citizens and be bold to step into the water to walk and see if they will sink or be divinely guided. It is not enough to be part of the crowd hailing and wailing. Because, complainers don’t contribute and if Christian’s kept complaining, things are bad, they should endeavour to be committed and make a difference to improve things for our comfort. The attitude of sitting on the fence is saying, things are impossible with God.

"As citizens, Christians should show high level of commitment and interest in their locality administration and governance by getting involve, make contribution and participate with the accountability spirit, fear of God and consciousness of people’s expectations. They should not compromise their faith, but be prayerful and sensitive in the spirit for direction.

"Christians should use the power and authority of the Word, and citizenship to encourage, enthrone and establish good governance that will positively impact and secure the future of Nigerian society, he advised."

References 

Living people
1963 births
Members of the House of Representatives (Nigeria)